Ricardo Andreutti (otherwise known as Ricky, born June 30, 1987) is a retired footballer who hails from Caracas, Venezuela. Generally, his preferred position was as defensive midfielder.

Early life and youth
Andreutti was born in Caracas, in 1987.

At the age of 18, he joined Italian amateur outfit AC Chioggia Sottomarina which later amalgamated with local rivals ASD Sottomarina Lido to become Clodiense S.S.D. and made a total of five first-team appearances. From there, he would then go to Uruguay and play there.

Transfers

Petare FC
After Uruguay, Andreutti returned to Venezuela to join Petare F.C.

Caracas FC
In 2013, he was bought by Primera División club Caracas FC for an unknown price to bolster their defensive midfield options.
A fan favorite with Caracas FC, he donned the number 15 shirt with them as well.

ACD Lara
After Leaving Caracas FC, Andreutti joined ACD Lara on a two and a half year deal.

Personal life
Similar to Andreutti, his father was a full-time footballer and was with Caracas FC when they were known as Caracas Yamaha FC and married Veronica Jordán on December 14, 1984. His last name, Jordán, refers to his maternal side of the family. Their parents ran a motorcycle spare parts business.

Three years later, a brother named Victoria was born, adding another member into the Andreutti family.

Aged six, he began playing football. As an alternate interest, Ricardo started judo for a while.

International Cup Appearances

Achievements and honours
 Copa Venezuela winner (2013)
 Venezuelan Primera División runners-up (2008-09)

References

External links
 

Venezuelan footballers
Venezuelan expatriate footballers
People from Caracas
Venezuelan Primera División players
Caracas FC players
Asociación Civil Deportivo Lara players
Deportivo Miranda F.C. players
Association football midfielders
Living people
Venezuelan people of Italian descent
1987 births
Venezuelan expatriate sportspeople in Italy
Expatriate footballers in Italy